The Hartwell House is a historic house in Reading, Massachusetts.  The -story wood-frame house was built in 1918 for George Hartwell, an engineer.  The most prominent feature of this Craftsman/Bungalow style house is its stonework: the front porch is supported by tapering piers of fieldstone, and the full length of its chimney is similarly composed.  There is a decorative woodwork trellis at the peak of the front gable.

The house was listed on the National Register of Historic Places in 1984.

See also
National Register of Historic Places listings in Reading, Massachusetts
National Register of Historic Places listings in Middlesex County, Massachusetts

References

Houses on the National Register of Historic Places in Reading, Massachusetts
Houses in Reading, Massachusetts
1918 establishments in Massachusetts
Houses completed in 1918
American Craftsman architecture in Massachusetts